The 1939 Amateur World Series was the second Amateur World Series (AWS), an international men's amateur baseball tournament. The tournament was sanctioned by the International Baseball Federation (which titled it the Baseball World Cup as of the 1988 tournament). Great Britain did not defend the AWS title it had won in the inaugural event the previous year. The tournament took place, for the first time, in Cuba. It was contested by the national teams of Cuba, Nicaragua and the United States, playing six games each from August 12 through August 26. Cuba won its first AWS titlethe first of what would be a record 26 titles by the time the series ended in 2011, 22 more titles than the next closest nation.

Venue

Results

Final standings

Players
 
 Bernardo Cuervo hit .200 with two triples and six runs batted in (led tournament).
 Ernesto Estevez hit .389 with two doubles.
 Wenceslao Gonzalez hit .500 (3 for 6).
 Pedro Natilla Jimenez was the best pitcher in the tournament with a 2–0 record and a 0.95 earned run average.
 Esteban Macqiues hit .250 with 7 runs (led tournament).
 Connie Marrero played, and would become a Washington Senators pitcher in the future.
 Juan J. Torres won the most valuable player award for the tournament despite a .174 batting average.
 G. Toyo hit .333 (9 for 27), tied for lead in hits.
 
 Stanley Cayasso hit one of only two home runs of the tournament plus two doubles to start a string of successful appearances in the tournament.
 C. Newell stole four bases to lead the tournament in that category
 Jonathan Robinson hit the other home run of the tournament.

References
 Bjarkman, P. A History of Cuban Baseball

Amateur World Series, 1939
Baseball World Cup
1939
1939 in Cuban sport
August 1939 sports events
Baseball competitions in Havana
1930s in Havana